Dan Peder Clemens Ekborg  (born 23 November 1955) is a Swedish actor. He is the son of actor Lars Ekborg and older brother of actor Anders Ekborg.

He has starred in many of the Swedish Jönssonligan films. He is also the Swedish voice for Hades in Disney's Hercules  and the Swedish voice for Genie in Disney's Aladdin.
He participated as a celebrity dance in Let's Dance 2019, which is broadcast on TV4

References

External links 
 
 

1955 births
Living people
Swedish male film actors
Swedish male stage actors
Swedish male voice actors
Litteris et Artibus recipients